Mezőkeresztes is a town in Borsod-Abaúj-Zemplén county, Northern Hungary near Mezőkövesd and Eger.

Location
 south from county seat Miskolc. Can be reached by car on highway M3.

History
The area around it has been inhabited since the Great Migration. In the 14th century it belonged to the Diósgyőr estate. King Ladislaus V granted market town status to Mezőkeresztes.

In 1596, there was a great Battle of Mezőkeresztes, where Mehmed III, a sultan of the Ottoman Empire defeated the Habsburg and Transylvanian forces. During the battle the Sultan had to be dissuaded from fleeing the field halfway through the battle.

After the end of the Ottoman era, the town prospered but in the 19th century it lost its importance and became a village.

In 1950, oil resources were found nearby; they were exploited by the 1980s.

Mezőkeresztes was granted town status on July 1, 2009.

Nearby villages
Mezőnagymihály (cca. 4 km), Mezőnyárád (4 km), Szentistván (cca. 8 km)

Nearest town: Mezőkövesd (12 km).

References

External links

  in Hungarian

Populated places in Borsod-Abaúj-Zemplén County